Lobang Jepang or Lubang Jepang (which means 'Japanese tunnel' in Indonesian) is an underground military complex, which is now one of the historical tourist attraction in the city of Bukittinggi, West Sumatra in Indonesia. 

The Japanese tunnel is a protection tunnel built by the Japanese occupying army around 1942 for defense purposes, which was fully completed in June, 1944. It was first discovered in the early 1950s and opened to tourists in 1994. As is known, during World War II in 1942 Japanese occupied force had begun to be pressured by Allied forces, and started to construct many hiding tunnels across the archipelago of then Dutch East Indies , not only in Bukittinggi, but also in cities of Bandung and Biak, as well as other places in Indonesia.

History

The tunnel was made by the instructions of Lieutenant General Moritake Tanabe, Commander in Chief of the 25th Army of the Japanese Army. The purpose of building this tunnel was to use as a place for storing supplies and equipment for Japanese army warfare.  this tunnel, including the reconnaissance room, ambush room, prison, and arsenal.
 
In addition to its strategic location in a city that was once the center of Sumatra's government, the land that became the wall of this tunnel is a type of land which if mixed with water will be more robust. Even the earthquake that shook West Sumatra in 2009 did not damage the structure of the tunnel much.

It is estimated that tens of thousands of forced labor or romusha were mobilized from the islands of Java, Sulawesi and Kalimantan to dig this tunnel. The selection of labor from outside this area is a Japanese colonial strategy to maintain the secrecy of this mega project. Workers from Bukittinggi themselves were deployed including working on defense tunnels in Bandung and Biak Island. Thousands of workers died to build this tunnel.

Attractions

The Japanese tunnels began to be managed as historical attractions in 1984, by the city government of Bukittinggi. Some of the entrances to the Japanese tunnel are located in the Sianok Gorge area, Panorama Park, next to the Bung Hatta Palace and at the Bukittinggi Zoo. Only 1.5 kilometers of this tunnel are accessible for tourists; it is touted as the longest tunnel in Asia with a total length of up to 8 km. The winding tunnel had a width of about 2 meters, with a depth of 49 meters below ground. There are 21 small aisles whose functions vary, ranging from ammunition rooms, meeting rooms, escape doors, ambush rooms, kitchen room and prisons.

Apparently the kitchen room wasn't used not only for cooking, but also used to chop dead prisoners and dump them through the water hole down. In this place there are 2 small holes, one above for reconnaissance, and one more hole below which was then used to dispose of the bodies of forced workers and prisoners of war who died due to cruel torture of Japanese soldiers. On the four sides of the kitchen wall there are strokes. 

In the kitchen there is a concrete table which was allegedly used to execute prisoners. When the tunnel was not opened to the public, there were skulls and tools to build like hoes.

References

History of West Sumatra
Tourist attractions in West Sumatra
1942 in the Dutch East Indies
Tunnels completed in 1945
World War II sites in Indonesia